Asparagine synthase (glutamine-hydrolysing) (asparagine synthetase (glutamine-hydrolysing), glutamine-dependent asparagine synthetase, asparagine synthetase B, AS, AS-B) is an enzyme with systematic name L-aspartate:L-glutamine amido-ligase (AMP-forming). This enzyme catalyses the following chemical reaction

 ATP + L-aspartate + L-glutamine + H2O  AMP + diphosphate + L-asparagine + L-glutamate (overall reaction)
 (1a) L-glutamine + H2O  L-glutamate + NH3
 (1b) ATP + L-aspartate + NH3  AMP + diphosphate + L-asparagine

The enzyme from Escherichia coli has two active sites.

References

External links 
 

EC 6.3.5